St. Stephens School, Pitampura is a co-educational senior secondary school, located in New Delhi's Pitampura, is affiliated to Central Board of Secondary Education (CBSE). The school offers good facilities to students in both academics and extra-curricular activities.

External links 
 

Schools in Delhi